Hardwood Records is a Canadian independent record label, owned and operated by singer-songwriter Hayden. Originally formed to distribute his own albums, the label has also released albums by Cuff the Duke, Basia Bulat and Lou Canon.

See also
 List of record labels

References

External links
 Official website

Canadian independent record labels
Vanity record labels
Indie rock record labels
Record labels established in 1994